The Garfield County Frontier Fairgrounds, near Burwell, Nebraska, also known as Burwell Rodeo Ground, is a historic property with significance dating to 1922.  A  area was listed as a historic district on the U.S. National Register of Historic Places in 1985.  The listing included 13 contributing buildings and seven other contributing structures.

By the mid-1980s, it was Nebraska's oldest rodeo venue in which the original buildings were still being used for their original purposes.

References

External links 

Buildings and structures completed in 1922
Buildings and structures in Garfield County, Nebraska
Tourist attractions in Garfield County, Nebraska
Historic districts on the National Register of Historic Places in Nebraska
National Register of Historic Places in Garfield County, Nebraska